Koloff is a surname. Notable people with the surname include:

Ivan Koloff (1942–2017), Canadian wrestler
Kolby Koloff (born 1996), American Christian musician
Nikita Koloff (born 1959), American wrestler

See also
Kolff